Electric Food is the self-titled album of Electric Food, a studio project that included (uncredited) singer George Mavros with musicians from Lucifer's Friend that released two albums in 1970, the other being Flash. In 2004 Electric Food and Flash were released on one CD by Mason Records. Both Electric Food albums sound very similar to Lucifer's Friend's debut but include strong influences from Led Zeppelin, Uriah Heep, and Spooky Tooth.

The music served as soundtrack to  the popular Europa audio plays.

Track listing

Side one
"Whole Lotta Love" (Led Zeppelin cover) - 3:24
"The Reason Why" (Peter Hesslein, Monro) - 3:18
"Hey Down" (Peter Hesslein, Monro) - 4:30
"Tavern" (Peter Hesslein, Monro) - 4:03
"Going to See My Mother" (Peter Hesslein, Monro) - 1:59
"House of the Rising Sun" (Traditional) - 3:54

Side two
"Let's Work Together" (Canned Heat cover) - 2:41
"Sule Skerry" (Peter Hesslein, Monro) - 4:40
"Nosferatu" (Peter Hesslein, Monro) - 4:52
"Twelve Months and a Day" (Peter Hesslein, Monro) - 2:38
"Icerose" (Peter Hesslein, Monro) - 2:53
"I'll Try" (Peter Hesslein, Monro) - 3:13
("Monro" is a pseudonym of George Mavros)

Performers (uncredited)
 George Mavros – lead vocals
 Peter Hesslein – lead guitars, backing vocals
 Peter Hecht – keyboards
 Dieter Horns  – bass
 Joachim "Addy" Rietenbach – drums

External links
 Electric Food review & credits at AllMusic.com
 Electric Food at Discogs.com

Electric Food albums
1970 debut albums